The men's doubles tournament at the 1989 US Open was held from August 28 to September 10, 1989, on the outdoor hard courts of the USTA National Tennis Center in New York City, United States. John McEnroe and Mark Woodforde won the title, defeating Ken Flach and Robert Seguso in the final.

Seeds

Draw

Finals

Top half

Section 1

Section 2

Bottom half

Section 3

Section 4

External links
 Main draw
1989 US Open – Men's draws and results at the International Tennis Federation

Men's Doubles
US Open (tennis) by year – Men's doubles